Liu Ming (Liú Míng), Prince of Jichuan (Jìchuān Wáng), was a prince of the Han dynasty. He was the second son and heir of Liu Wu, prince of Liang. He did not receive all of his father's inheritance; instead, his uncle the emperor Jing divided the realm of Liang into five pieces. Liu Ming ruled his part of Liang from 144–138 BC.

References

Prince of Jichuan